Dmitri Vladimirovich Kudinov (born 25 August 1985) is a Russian former professional footballer.

Club career
He made his debut in the Russian Premier League in 2005 for FC Torpedo Moscow.

References

1985 births
Living people
Russian footballers
FC Torpedo Moscow players
FC Anzhi Makhachkala players
FC KAMAZ Naberezhnye Chelny players
FC Salyut Belgorod players
Russian Premier League players
FC SKA-Khabarovsk players
FC Petrotrest players
FC Dynamo Saint Petersburg players
FC Saturn Ramenskoye players
Russian expatriate footballers
Expatriate footballers in Armenia
FC Mika players
Association football defenders
FC Moscow players
FC Shinnik Yaroslavl players
FC Luch Vladivostok players
FC Avangard Kursk players